The Brazos River, called the Río de los Brazos de Dios (translated as "The River of the Arms of God") by early Spanish explorers, is the 11th-longest river in the United States at  from its headwater source at the head of Blackwater Draw, Roosevelt County, New Mexico to its mouth at the Gulf of Mexico with a  drainage basin. Being one of Texas' largest rivers, it is sometimes used to mark the boundary between East Texas and West Texas.

The river is closely associated with Texas history, particularly the Austin settlement and Texas Revolution eras. Today major Texas institutions such as Texas Tech University, Baylor University, and Texas A&M University are located close to the river's basin, as are parts of metropolitan Houston.

Geography
Another major tributary of the Upper Brazos is the Clear Fork Brazos River, which passes by Abilene and joins the main river near Graham. Important tributaries of the Lower Brazos include the Paluxy River, the Bosque River, the Little River, Yegua Creek, the Nolan River, the Leon River, the San Gabriel River, the Lampasas River, and the Navasota River.

Initially running east towards Dallas-Fort Worth, the Brazos turns south, passing through Waco and the Baylor University campus, further south to near Calvert, Texas, then past Bryan and College Station, then through Richmond, Texas, in Fort Bend County, and empties into the Gulf of Mexico in the marshes just south of Freeport.

The main stem of the Brazos is dammed in three places, all north of Waco, forming Possum Kingdom Lake, Lake Granbury, and Lake Whitney. Of these three, Granbury was the last to be completed, in 1969. When its construction was proposed in the mid-1950s, John Graves wrote the book Goodbye to a River.  The Whitney Dam, located on the upper Brazos, provides hydroelectric power, flood control, and irrigation to enable efficient cotton growth in the river valley. A small municipal dam (Lake Brazos Dam) is near the downstream city limit of Waco at the end of the Baylor campus; it raises the level of the river through the city to form a town lake. This impoundment of the Brazos through Waco is locally called Lake Brazos. Nineteen major reservoirs are located along the Brazos.

History 

In 1822, the lower river valley of the Brazos River became one of the major Anglo-American settlement sites in Texas. This was one of the first English-speaking colonies along the Brazos and was founded by Stephen F. Austin at San Felipe de Austin. In 1836, Texas declared independence from Mexico at Washington-on-the-Brazos, a settlement in now Washington County that is known as "the birthplace of Texas". Brazos River was also the scene of a battle between the Texas Navy and Mexican Navy during the Texas Revolution. Texas Navy ship Independence was defeated by one Mexican vessel.

When it was first named by European explorers is unclear, since it was often confused with the Colorado River not far to the south, but it was certainly seen by René-Robert Cavelier, Sieur de La Salle. Later Spanish accounts call it Los Brazos de Dios (the arms of God), for which name several different explanations were given, all involving it being the first water to be found by desperately thirsty parties. In 1842, Indian commissioner of Texas, Ethan Stroud established a trading post on this river.

The river was important for navigation before and after the American Civil War, and steamboats sailed as far up the river as Washington-on-the-Brazos. While attempts to improve commercial navigation on the river continued, railroads proved more reliable. The Brazos River also flooded, often seriously, on a regular basis before a piecemeal levee system was replaced, notably in 1913 when a massive flood affected the course of the river. The river is primarily important today as a source of water for power, irrigation, and recreation.  The water is administered by the Brazos River Authority.

The 2000 book, Sandbars and Sternwheelers: Steam Navigation on the Brazos by Pamela A. Puryear and Nath Winfield, Jr., with introduction by J. Milton Nance, examines the early vessels that attempted to navigate the Brazos.

On June 2, 2016, the rising of the river required evacuations for portions of Brazoria County.

Watershed 
Within the watershed lie 42 lakes and rivers, which have a combined storage capacity of 2.5 million acre-feet. The Brazos watershed also has an estimated groundwater availability of 119,275 acre-feet per year. Around 31% of the land use within the watershed is cropland, and roughly 61% is grassland (30%), shrubland (19.8%), and forest (11%), while urban use only makes up 4.6%. The population density within the watershed is 50.5 people/sq mi (19.5/km2).

Water quality concerns 
The main water-quality issues within the Brazos watershed are high nutrient loads, high bacterial and salinity levels, and low dissolved oxygen. These issues can be attributed to livestock waste, fertilizer, and chemical run offs. Sources of run off are croplands, pastures, and industrial sites, among others. The watershed receiving the most toxic pollution is the lower Brazos river, which received 33.4 million pounds of toxic waste in 2012.

Recreation 
Canoeing is a very popular recreational activity on the Brazos River, with many locations favorable for launching and recovery.  The best paddling can be found immediately below Possum Kingdom Lake and Lake Granbury.

Sandbar camping is also permitted, since the entire streambed of the river is considered to be state-owned public property.  Fishing, camping, and picnicking are legal here, including on the sandbars.
Several  scout camps are located along the Brazos River, and they support a wide range of water and shoreline activities for scouts, youth groups, and family groups.

The Brazos River Authority maintains several public campsites along the river and at the lakes.    Hunting is also permitted at select locations along the river.  Fishing is permitted on all of the river, subject to regulations. Outdoor enthusiasts have the opportunity to view the area's scenery and the wildlife on the river. Fly fishing and river fishing for largemouth bass are common.

Cultural references

 The Lyle Lovett covers of Steve Fromholz' songs "Texas Trilogy: Bosque County Romance" and "Texas River Song" both mention the Brazos.
 The Alan Le May novel The Searchers mentions the Salt Fork of the Brazos River several times as a likely place for the protagonists to find Chief Scar, who is holding the captive child Debbie. In the 1956 film based on the novel, Mose Harper identifies the location of Chief Scar's camp as Seven Fingers, which a group of Texas Rangers identify as Seven Fingers of the Brazos.
 John Graves' travel narrative Goodbye to a River takes place on the Brazos River.
 The Brazos is the setting of the American folk song "Ain't No More Cane".
 "Broke Down on the Brazos" is the first track on Gov’t Mule’s 2009 album By A Thread.
 The Robert Earl Keen's "The Front Porch Song" contains the lyrics "the Brazos still runs muddy like she's run all along".
 The Old Crow Medicine Show song "Take 'em Away" contains the lyrics "Land that I know is where two rivers collide / The Brazos, the Navasota, and the big blue sky".
 The chorus to the Amanda Shires song "Mineral Wells" contains the lyrics "At night I dream I'm in the Brazos River / Pines and cypress of the West Cross Timbers".
 The James Reasoner Civil War Series references the Brazos River many times as it is the goal of one of the main characters to move there after the war is over.
"Cross the Brazos at Waco" song by Billy Walker.
The Brazos is mentioned throughout "The Rivers of Texas" performed by Mason Williams.
The Uncle Lucius song "Keep the Wolves Away" mentions the Brazos and Galveston Bay.
"Brazos River", a song by Texas-based singer-songwriter Lomelda.
 The Brazos is featured prominently as one of the first major hurdles for the wagon train of pioneers in the television drama 1883.
 An account of Texas residents crossing the Brazos during the Runaway Scrape of the Texas Revolution is featured in “True Women: A Novel of Texas” by Janice Woods Windle (1993).
 In the King of the Hill episode "Après Hank, le Deluge", high water levels in the upper Brazos River put Heimlich and Travis counties at risk of flooding.
 The Brazos is featured in the song "Texas River Song" by Little Mazarn

See also

 Battle of the Brazos
 Blanco Canyon
 Brazoria, Texas
 Brazos Belle
 Brazosport Independent School District
 Canyon Valley, Texas
 Double Mountains (Texas)
 Double Mountain Fork Brazos River
 List of rivers of Texas
 List of longest rivers of the United States (by main stem)
 Mount Blanco
 North Fork Double Mountain Fork Brazos River
 USS Brazos (AO-4), a fleet oiler built in 1919
 White River (Texas)
 Yellow House Canyon
 Port Freeport

Footnotes

Further reading

 Archer, Kenna Lang, “A Defiant River, A Technocratic Ideal: Big Dams and Even Bigger Hopes along the Brazos River, 1929–1958,” East Texas Historical Journal, 53 (Fall 2015), 67–87.
 Archer, Kenna Lang. Unruly Waters: A Social and Environmental History of the Brazos River. Albuquerque, NM: University of New Mexico Press, 2015.
 Hendrickson, Jr., Kenneth E. The Waters of the Brazos: A History of the Brazos River Authority 1929-1979. Waco, TX: The Texian Press, 1981.
 Kimmel, Jim. 2011. Exploring the Brazos River: from beginning to end. Texas A&M Press. College Station, TX.

External links

Brazos River Authority
Public domain photos of the Upper Brazos
Historic photos of Army Corps of Engineers lock and dam projects on the Brazos River, 1910-20s, from the Portal to Texas History
1858 map titled  from a trigonometrical survey under the direction of A. Bache ; triangulation by J.S. Williams ; topography by J.M. Wampler ; hydrography by the parties under the command of E.J. De Haven & J.K. Duer., hosted by the Portal to Texas History.

 
Rivers of Texas
Drainage basins of the Gulf of Mexico
Rivers of Brazoria County, Texas
Rivers of Fort Bend County, Texas
Rivers of Hood County, Texas
Rivers of McLennan County, Texas
Rivers of Stonewall County, Texas
Rivers of Palo Pinto County, Texas
Rivers of Waller County, Texas